Counterpoint with Secretary Salvador Panelo is a Filipino public affairs talk show hosted by then-Chief Presidential Legal Counsel Salvador Panelo broadcast by Net 25. Initially produced by the Presidential Broadcast Staff - Radio Television Malacañang for the People's Television Network (PTV), the program was used to be a platform for voicing Panelo's arguments for and defense of the actions taken by the government under then-President Rodrigo Duterte. The show's first season aired on IBC from October 29, 2008 to 2010, the second season aired on PTV from May 1, 2020 to September 24, 2022, and the third season aired on Net 25 from August 31, 2022 to present.

Background
In October 2018, Salvador Panelo replaced Harry Roque as the Presidential Spokesperson of Rodrigo Duterte, as Roque aimed to run for congress in the 2019 midterm election. In 2020, as the COVID-19 pandemic became a threat the Philippines and forced President Duterte to declare an enhanced community quarantine for the entire Luzon area, he reappointed Roque as Presidential Spokesperson on April 13, with Panelo explaining that the crisis "requires a new task in messaging."

Production and airing
Counterpoint was created by Panelo as a new platform for "discussing the issues affecting our country", as well as "analyze, dissect issues raised by certain critics and others against certain policies of the government". Shot at the New Executive Building of Malacañang, the program began airing on PTV in the Philippines on May 1, 2020, and is simultaneously broadcast on social media pages of the Philippine government. Each episode is subsequently posted on YouTube after broadcast by the RTVMalacañang. The show ended its broadcast on September 24, 2021, weeks before he resigned as the Chief Presidential Legal Counsel and subsequently filed for candidacy for the 2022 Senatorial election.

Counterpoint is set to return on television following Panelo's election defeat, this time on Net 25, a free-to-air and cable television network owned by Iglesia ni Cristo's affiliate Eagle Broadcasting Corporation starting August 31, 2022, every Wednesday nights, 10:30 PM (PST).

Controversy
Panelo's remarks from the program's May 4 episode, which described the COVID-19 pandemic as potentially an "invasion" and grounds for martial law, was criticized by the National Union of People's Lawyers as "constitutionally preposterous" and led Harry Roque to announce that Duterte disagrees with Panelo's position. Panelo later clarified that his remarks were for the purpose of a "theoretical discussion".

References

2009 Philippine television series debuts
2010 Philippine television series endings
2020 Philippine television series debuts
2021 Philippine television series endings
2022 Philippine television series debuts
English-language television shows
Filipino-language television shows
Intercontinental Broadcasting Corporation original programming
People's Television Network original programming
Net 25 original programming
Presidential Communications Group (Philippines)
Television controversies in the Philippines